Blackwood railway station may refer to:

Blackwood railway station, Adelaide
Blackwood railway station (Strathclyde)
Blackwood railway station (Wales)